Prathipadu or Prattipadu is the name of villages in different districts of Andhra Pradesh, India.

 Prathipadu, East Godavari district
 Prathipadu, Guntur district
 Prathipadu, Kakinada Assembly constituency, East Godavari district
 Prathipadu (SC) Assembly constituency, Guntur district